Laurence Crawford "Larry" O'Keefe (born 1969) is an American composer and lyricist for Broadway musicals, film and television. He won the 2001 Lucille Lortel Award, Outstanding Musical as composer for Bat Boy: The Musical.

Early life and education
O'Keefe was born in 1969. He is the second of three sons born to writer and editor Daniel O'Keefe and his wife Deborah. All three sons also became writers. Laurence O'Keefe is a graduate of Harvard College (1991), where he studied anthropology, wrote humor for the Harvard Lampoon, and sang with the Harvard Krokodiloes. 
He got his start in musical theater through Harvard's Hasty Pudding Theatricals, performing in the Pudding's drag burlesques. He also composed Suede Expectations, book by Mo Rocca, and wrote a libretto for another production, Romancing the Throne.

O'Keefe later studied composition and film scoring at Berklee College of Music and the University of Southern California, receiving a masters in composition for film and television.

Career

Bat Boy: The Musical
O'Keefe has composed music and lyrics for a wide variety of works. He wrote the score for Bat Boy: The Musical, which ran Off-Broadway from March 3 to December 2, 2001. Bat Boy received eight Drama Desk Award nominations, including for Outstanding Music and Outstanding Lyrics, won two Richard Rodgers Awards from the American Academy of Arts and Letters, and won both the Lucille Lortel Award and the Outer Critics' Circle Award for Best Off-Broadway Musical. It has since been produced by more than 500 regional and amateur companies across the USA. Bat Boy: The Musical opened at the Shaftesbury Theatre on London's West End on September 8, 2004, and ran until January 15, 2005.

Bat Boy: The Musical has also been produced in Seoul, South Korea, and Tokyo and Osaka in Japan, and at the Edinburgh Festival Fringe. In 2001, O'Keefe received the Jonathan Larson Performing Arts Foundation Award. In 2004 O'Keefe won the Ed Kleban Award for Outstanding Lyrics, a $100,000 prize, in part for his work on Bat Boy. There are two Kleban Awards every year, one given to a lyricist, the other to a book writer.

Legally Blonde: The Musical
O'Keefe and his wife Nell Benjamin's Legally Blonde: The Musical opened in San Francisco on February 2, 2007. It opened on Broadway at the Palace Theatre on April 29, 2007, and closed on October 19, 2008. For their work on Legally Blonde, they received Drama Desk nominations for Outstanding Music and Outstanding Lyrics, as well as a Tony Award nomination for Best Score.

The first national tour of Legally Blonde opened at the Providence Performing Arts Center on September 23, 2008. While nearly identical to the Broadway production, the touring production received considerably more enthusiastic reviews than the Broadway version, and was more profitable. The first national tour ended August 15, 2010, at the Wolf Trap Arts Center in Vienna, Virginia.

Legally Blonde opened on January 12, 2010 at the Savoy Theatre in London's West End, starring UK television stars Sheridan Smith, Jill Halfpenny and Peter Davison, plus pop star Duncan James. Many reviews were positive, especially for the cast. The Independent reviewer wrote: "Totally blown away...it's ridiculously enjoyable from start to finish." The Guardian reviewer concluded "the predominantly female audience with whom I saw the show seemed to be having a whale of a time and did not give a damn about the fact that the musical is little more than a nonsensical fairytale."

Legally Blonde won three 2011 Laurence Olivier Awards including Best New Musical and Best Actress in a Musical for Sheridan Smith and Best Supporting Performance in a Musical for Jill Halfpenny.

The show has had several tours worldwide, including the UK, Australia, and New Zealand. 
 It premiered to a sold-out audience at the Ronacher Theatre in Vienna, Austria.

Heathers: The Musical
With co-author Kevin Murphy, O'Keefe co-wrote Heathers: The Musical, a musical based on the movie of the same name. Directed by Andy Fickman, the musical premiered at the Hudson Backstage Theatre in Los Angeles in September 2013. The musical then was produced Off-Broadway in 2014 at the New World Stages Theatre. Heathers received its UK premiere at The Other Palace in London in June 2018. Starring Carrie Hope Fletcher as Veronica and Jamie Muscato as JD, the production was a huge hit; on the first day tickets went on sale, the demand for tickets crashed the Other Palace website twice, and whole eight-week limited run sold out before opening night.

The show moved to the West End, opening at the Theatre Royal Haymarket on September 14, 2018. The musical received six nominations for the 2019 Whatsonstage.com Awards, including Best New Musical (winner), Best Actor In A Musical (Muscato), Best Actress In A Musical (winner, Fletcher), Best Director (Andy Fickman) and 
Best Lighting Design (Ben Cracknell).

Theatre, TV and concerts
O'Keefe and his wife Nell Benjamin collaborated on a short musical titled The Mice. The Mice was presented by Hal Prince as a part of the three-show evening 3hree at the Prince Music Theater in Philadelphia in 2000 and in Los Angeles in 2001.

With Benjamin, O'Keefe has written two musicals for Theatreworks USA: Cam Jansen (2004) and Sarah, Plain and Tall (2002). 

In February 2004, O'Keefe guest-conducted the Harvard Pops Orchestra in an evening of his songs, and premiered his short opera The Magic Futon. A repeat performance with the Pops was presented in November 2008.

O'Keefe worked with David Shiner on the music, lyrics, and book, for Drop Everything, a new clown show/musical, workshopped at ACT Theatre in Seattle. Excerpts were also produced at the Tollwood Arts Festival in Munich and the Lisbon Comedy Festival.

O'Keefe and Benjamin wrote an operatic musical, first produced at New York's Fiorello H. LaGuardia High School of Music & Art and Performing Arts in 2012, titled Life of The Party. It was set in the Soviet Union in 1953 and based on true stories. It focused on the artists who labored under harrowing conditions to create Soviet movie musicals, trying to please both Stalin's regime and the public. The show later received a new workshop at New York University's Steinhardt School in March 2017.

O'Keefe and Benjamin have written many songs and pieces for movies, television and concerts, including The Daily Show on Comedy Central, Johnny and the Sprites on The Disney Channel, Ant & Dec's Saturday Night Takeaway on UK's ITV, Defiance on SyFy, and Julie's Greenroom on Netflix. O'Keefe arranged and orchestrated the overture and other pieces of music for a Beatles tribute concert at the Hollywood Bowl, titled "Sgt. Pepper's At 40". O'Keefe and Benjamin contributed a new song, "This Is The Show", to the season finale of Best Time Ever With Neil Patrick Harris on NBC.

They wrote narration and new comic verses for the New York Philharmonic's New Year's Eve 2015 gala, La Vie Parisienne. This was set to the music of Camille Saint-Saëns's Carnival Of The Animals, replacing the traditional introductory poems by Ogden Nash, and performed that night by Nathan Lane.

Teaching and other work 
O'Keefe is active as a writer, teacher and advocate in the Broadway and New York theatre communities. He has served on the Nominating Committee of the Tony Awards. He is a member of the Dramatists Guild, where he teaches composition and writing to emerging theater artists as the co-head of the Dramatists Guild Foundation's Fellows Program, and conducts master classes for the DGF's Traveling Fellows Program.  Since 2005 O'Keefe has served as the head of the Music Department and Resident Artist for Harvard University's Freshman Arts Program. He teaches master classes across the country at Harvard, NYU, Berklee College of Music, Yale University and elsewhere.

List of shows and major theatre productions 
 1996 – Euphoria, The Actors' Gang Theater, Los Angeles
 1997 – Bat Boy: The Musical, The Actors' Gang Theater, Los Angeles
 2000, 2001 – The Mice, Prince Music Theater, Philadelphia and Ahmanson Theatre, Los Angeles
 2001 – Bat Boy: The Musical, Union Square Theatre, New York
 2002 – Sarah, Plain and Tall, based on the Patricia MacLachlan children's book
 2004 – Cam Jansen and the Curse of the Emerald Elephant, after the Cam Jansen mystery series, Lamb's Theatre, New York
 2004 – Bat Boy: The Musical, West Yorkshire Playhouse, Leeds; and Shaftesbury Theatre, London
 2007 – Legally Blonde: The Musical, Golden Gate Theatre, San Francisco; and Palace Theatre, New York
 2008 and 2011 – Legally Blonde: The Musical, 1st US National Tour; 2nd US National Tour
 2010 – Legally Blonde: The Musical, Savoy Theatre, London
 2010 – Heathers, Joe's Pub, New York
 2012, 2017 – Life of the Party, LaGuardia High School of Art, Music and Performing Arts, NYU Steinhardt School, New York; 
 2012 and 2016– Legally Blonde: The Musical, 1st UK/Ireland National Tour; 2nd UK/Ireland National Tour
 2013 – Legally Blonde: The Musical, Ronacher Theatre, Vienna
 2013 – Heathers: The Musical, Hudson Theatre, Los Angeles
 2014 – Heathers: The Musical, New World Stages, New York
 2018 – Heathers: The Musical, The Other Palace, London; and Theatre Royal Haymarket, London

References

External links

1969 births
Living people
American musical theatre composers
Broadway composers and lyricists
The Harvard Lampoon alumni
Harvard College alumni
Date of birth missing (living people)
Place of birth missing (living people)
Berklee College of Music alumni
University of Southern California alumni
Hasty Pudding alumni